is a mountain located on the border of Yamagata Prefecture with Niigata Prefecture, in northern Japan. It is part of the Asahi Mountain Range, which is part of Bandai-Asahi National Park.

It is one of the mountains described in Kyūya Fukada's book 100 Famous Japanese Mountains.

References

Asahi